Safety hazards have been noted due to pedestrians walking slowly and without attention to their surroundings because they are focused upon their smartphones. Texting pedestrians may trip over curbs, walk out in front of cars and bump into other walkers. The field of vision of a smartphone user is estimated to be just 5% of a normal pedestrian's. 

Some cities have taken design measures to make the streets safer for inattentive pedestrians, including lights embedded in pavements, and dedicated lanes for smartphone-using pedestrians to use.

The pejorative term smartphone zombie has been used to describe inattentive phone users, and in Hong Kong they are called dai tau juk ("the head-down tribe"). A 2017 review considered the popular culture term in regards to the medical diagnoses of internet addiction disorder and other forms of digital media overuse.

Urban design

In Chongqing, China, the government constructed a dedicated smartphone-sidewalk in 2014, separating the phone users and the non-phone users. A similar scheme was introduced in Antwerp the following year.

In Augsburg, Bodegraven and Cologne, ground-level traffic lights embedded in the pavement have been introduced so that they are more visible to preoccupied pedestrians, while traffic signals at an intersection in Zagreb cast the red light downwards, producing glare on smartphone screens.

In Seoul, warning signs have been placed on the pavement at dangerous intersections following over a thousand road accidents caused by smartphones in South Korea in 2014.

Phone technology
An app which uses the phone's camera to make the screen appear transparent can be used to provide some warning of hazards.

Legal measures

In October 2017, the City of Honolulu, Hawaii introduced a measure to fine pedestrians looking at smartphones while crossing the road.  In 2019, China introduced penalties for "activities affecting other vehicles or pedestrians" and a woman was fined 10 yuan in Wenzhou.

In fiction
Science fiction author Ray Bradbury wrote about people being distracted by miniaturised technology in the 1950s, in his stories such as The Pedestrian and Fahrenheit 451. He wrote in 1958 of observing a couple walking in Beverly Hills, the woman listening to a small transistor radio "oblivious to man and dog, listening to far winds and whispers and soap-opera cries, sleepwalking, helped up and down curbs by a husband who might just as well not have been there".

See also

Digital zombie
Jaywalking
Mobile phones and driving safety
Mobile phone overuse
Phubbing
Pokémon Go, a mobile game designed to be played outdoors

References

Further reading

External links
 

Digital media use and mental health
Computing and society
Pedestrian safety
Walking
Urban design
Mobile phone culture